Amanda Taylor (born 31 May 1973) is a former synchronized swimmer from South Africa.

References 

1973 births
Living people
South African synchronised swimmers
Olympic synchronised swimmers of South Africa
Synchronized swimmers at the 1992 Summer Olympics